Duley Trucc (born Tevin Speights on November 21, 1991 in Conway, South Carolina, United States) is an American musical artist and songwriter.

He has also performed at House of Blues in Myrtle Beach, South Carolina as a supporting act for Young Dolph before about 1,500 people.

Early life and education
Duley Trucc was born in Conway, South Carolina, United States. He grew up with his sister, Tiffany Speights, in a broken family as his parents, Liz Cunningham and Lee Speights, got divorced. He attended Conway High School for a year but was then expelled. He then entered Aynor High School and completed his high school education.

He wrote his first song, "Friday the 13th", when he was in 7th grade.

Career
Duley Trucc is a singer and a songwriter. He debuted in the music industry with his 14-track album, Mechanic under his stage name. The album was produced by Buckroll, Chase, WayTooLost, Jonathan Wells, Paven Melody, Rontz, Skye, Stunna, Tommy Franco, Chain Beats, and Wizzle Beatz.

He has worked with Lynn Tate, Mykko Montana, artist Boosie Badazz, and producer Jonathan Wells.

Duley Trucc's tracks, including "Above the Rim", "Trap Well", "Wait" and "Splash" were all radio hits. Some of his tracks feature themes about the COVID-19 pandemic.

Duley Trucc released the music video "Me or You [BLM]", featuring Boosie Badazz x O'shea in 2021. The video's themes are police brutality in the United States and the Black Lives Matter movement.

Selected discography

First Mixtape Foreign Lifestyle, released December 17, 2015
Intro (Duley Trucc)
Foreign ft. Zilla (Duley Trucc)
Swag ft. Versa Mane (Duley Trucc)
Annoying ft. Tezzy (Duley Trucc)
From the Block ft. Zilla and Danero (Duley Trucc)
Real Life Shit ft. Versa Mane (Duley Trucc)
Fancy ft. Zilla (Duley Trucc)
Trapwell ft. Remidi (Duley Trucc)
Moe Gunna Skit (Duley Trucc)
Ridiculous (Duley Trucc)
Above the Rim (Duley Trucc)
Gorgeous (Duley Trucc)
She Good (Duley Trucc)

Controversy
Trucc was arrested for drug possession in Conway, South Carolina in 2015, although the charges were later dropped.

References

External links

1991 births
Living people
People from Conway, South Carolina
African-American male singer-songwriters
21st-century African-American male singers
Singer-songwriters from South Carolina